Bundesverband der Arzneimittel-Importeure eV and Commission v Bayer (2004) C-2/01 is an EU competition law case, concerning the boundaries of unlawful collusion.

Facts
Bayer AG, the parent of one of the largest European chemical and pharmaceutical groups, manufactured Adalat, used to treat cardio-vascular disease. It was sold by wholly owned subsidiaries in different member states. National health authorities fix prices for medicines, and the Spanish and French prices were fixed at a rate 40 per cent lower than UK prices. Wholesalers were buying Adalat in Spain and France and importing it to the UK, meaning that Bayer UK was at a loss. Bayer changed its delivery policy, so that it did not fulfil all large orders placed by Spain and France.

The Commission found that Bayer France and Bayer Spain had made an agreement with wholesalers, which amounted to an unlawful export ban. Bayer argued that it was restricting sales from Spain and France to the UK, but it denied that the policy was implemented through any agreement.

Judgment
The ECJ held that Bayer had not acted unlawfully, because it had simply made a unilateral decision. To say that this was the same as an agreement would be to confuse (what is now) TFEU article 101 on collusion, with article 102 on abuse of monopoly power.

See also

EU competition law

Notes

References

European Union competition case law
2004 in case law
2004 in the European Union